Heidenlöcher is a 1986 Austrian drama film directed by Wolfram Paulus. It was entered into the 36th Berlin International Film Festival.

Cast
 Florian Pircher as Santner
 Albert Paulus as Ruap
 Helmut Vogel as Jacek
 Matthias Aichhorn as Dürlinger
 Rolf Zacher as Aufseher
 Claus-Dieter Reents as Gestapomann
 Maria Aichhorn as Frau Dürlinger
 Gerta Rettenwender as Frau Santner
 Joanna Madej as Agnes
 Franz Hafner as Forstmeister
 Doris Kreer as Lisabeth
 Hubsi Aichhorn as Festl
 Darius Polanski as Staschek
 Piotr Firackiewicz as Kowal

References

External links

1986 films
1986 drama films
Austrian drama films
1980s German-language films
Films directed by Wolfram Paulus